The Milwaukee Brewers' 1999 season involved the Brewers' finishing 5th in the National League Central with a record of 74 wins and 87 losses.

Offseason
 November 11, 1998: Bob Hamelin was released by the Brewers.
 November 20, 1998: Héctor Ramírez was signed as a free agent by the Brewers.
 December 1, 1999: Norberto Martin was signed as a free agent by the Brewers.
December 2, 1999: Dave Weathers was signed as a free agent with the Milwaukee Brewers.
 December 14, 1998: The Brewers traded a player to be named later to the Minnesota Twins for Alex Ochoa. The Brewers completed the deal by sending Darrell Nicholas (minors) to the Twins on December 15.
 December 18, 1998: Marc Newfield was released by the Brewers.
 January 27, 1999: Jim Abbott was signed as a free agent by the Brewers.

Regular season
 July 14, 1999: "Big Blue", a massive crane that was used to put the roof panels on soon to be completed Miller Park, collapsed while attempting to place one of the panels. Ultimately, this accident delayed the opening of Miller Park a full season and it wasn't opened until April 2001.

Opening Day Starters
Sean Berry
Jeromy Burnitz
Jeff Cirillo
Marquis Grissom
Geoff Jenkins
Mark Loretta
Dave Nilsson
Bill Pulsipher
Fernando Viña

Season standings

Record vs. opponents

Notable transactions
 April 12, 1999: Aaron Small was signed as a free agent by the Brewers.
 May 23, 1999: Aaron Small was released by the Brewers.
 June 2, 1999: Ben Sheets was drafted by the Brewers in the 1st round (10th pick) of the 1999 Major League Baseball draft. Player signed July 30, 1999.
 August 12, 1999: Jason Bere was signed as a free agent by the Brewers.
 August 18, 1999: Rich Becker was traded by the Brewers to the Oakland Athletics for a player to be named later. The Athletics completed the deal by sending Carl Dale to the Brewers on August 20.

Roster

Player stats

Batting

Starters by position
Note: Pos = Position; G = Games played; AB = At Bats; R = Runs; H = Hits; HR = Home runs; RBI = Runs batted in; Avg. = Batting average; SB = Stolen bases

Other batters
Note: G = Games played; AB = At bats; R = Runs; H = Hits; HR = Home runs; RBI = Runs batted in; Avg. = Batting average; SB = Stolen bases

Pitching

Starting pitchers 
Note: G = Games pitched; IP = Innings pitched; W = Wins; L = Losses; ERA = Earned run average; SO = Strikeouts; BB = Walks allowed

Other pitchers 
Note: G = Games; IP = Inning pitched; W = Wins; L = Losses; ERA = Earned run average; SO = Strikeouts

Relief pitchers 
Note: G = Games pitched; W = Wins; L = Losses; SV = Saves; ERA = Earned run average; SO = Strikeouts

Farm system

The Brewers' farm system consisted of eight minor league affiliates in 1999. The Brewers operated a Venezuelan Summer League team as a co-op with the Philadelphia Phillies and San Francisco Giants.

References

1999 Milwaukee Brewers team at Baseball-Reference
1999 Milwaukee Brewers team page at baseball-almanac.com

Milwaukee Brewers seasons
Milwaukee Brew
Milwaukee Brewers